Roy William Walsh (born 15 January 1947) is a former English footballer who played as an inside forward.

Career
In 1962, Walsh joined Ipswich Town as an apprentice. In 1965, Walsh signed professional forms with Ipswich. During his time at the club, Walsh made nine appearances in all competitions for Ipswich, all coming in the 1965–66 season. In 1967, Walsh signed for Southend United. Following a short spell at Southend, Walsh signed for Chelmsford City. Walsh later played for, and managed, hometown club Dedham Old Boys.

References

1947 births
Living people
Association football forwards
English footballers
English football managers
People from Dedham, Essex
Ipswich Town F.C. players
Southend United F.C. players
Chelmsford City F.C. players
English Football League players